Vitas Gerulaitis was the defending champion but lost in the semifinals to Björn Borg.

John McEnroe won in the final 7–5, 4–6, 6–2, 7–6 against Borg.

Seeds
A champion seed is indicated in bold text while text in italics indicates the round in which that seed was eliminated.

  Jimmy Connors (semifinals)
  Björn Borg (final)
  John McEnroe (champion)
  Brian Gottfried (quarterfinals)
  Vitas Gerulaitis (semifinals)
  John Alexander (quarterfinals)
  Gene Mayer (quarterfinals)
  Geoff Masters (quarterfinals)

Draw

References
1979 World Championship Tennis Finals Draw (Archived 2009-05-06)

Singles